Morocco national under-20 football team, represents Morocco in association football at an under-20 age level and is controlled by the Royal Moroccan Football Federation, the governing body for football in Morocco. The current coach is Zakaria Aboub.

Honours 
 African Youth Championship:
 Winners (1): 1997
 Arab Cup U-20:
 Winners (2): 1989, 2011
 UNAF U-20 Tournament:
 Winners (2): 2015, 2020
Islamic Solidarity Games
Gold Medalists (1): 2013
Mediterranean Games
Gold Medalists (1): 2013
Jeux de la Francophonie
Gold Medalists (1): 2017

Palestine Cup of Nations for Youth
Winner (1): 1989

FIFA World Cup U-20

Africa U-20 Cup of Nations

Tournament Records

UNAF U-20 Tournament record

Arab Cup U-20 record

Mediterranean Games

UNAF U-18 Tournament

Jeux de la Francophonie

Current squad
 The following players were called up for the 2023 Africa U-20 Cup of Nations qualification matches.
 Match dates: 18–24 October 2022
 Opposition: ,  and Caps and goals correct as of:'''18 October 2022, after the match against

Previous squads 

FIFA World Youth Championship squads
 1977 FIFA WYC
 1997 FIFA WYC
 2005 FIFA WYC

Africa U-20 Cup of Nations squads
 2005 AYC squad
 2021 CAN U-20 squad

References

African national under-20 association football teams
under-20
Youth football in Morocco